Kappa Psi Kappa is a non-profit, non-collegiate, service/social fraternity for "progressive" men of all ethnic backgrounds, cultures and sexual orientations. The fraternity was established on August 17, 2001, in Tallahassee, Florida. The fraternity has over 200 members in the United States.  Kappa Psi Kappa celebrated its 10th anniversary on August 17, 2011.

History 
Kappa Psi Kappa was founded by five men in Tallahassee, FL on the campus of Florida State University. They were known as the Illustrious Elite. In the summer of 2001, these men set out and started to organize the foundation of the fraternity based upon promoting brotherhood, scholarship, service and leadership. The fraternity was incorporated under the Articles of Corporation in the State of Florida on October 3, 2001.

Membership 
Membership into the Kappa Psi Kappa Brotherhood is open to any man over the age of 18 who has obtained his high school diploma or GED.  Current enrollment in an institute of higher learning is not a requirement for membership.

Because Kappa Psi Kappa is a Service-Social organization, community service is not only a requirement to maintain active status membership within the Fraternity, it is also a requirement to apply for membership.

Once a Pledge has successfully completed the Membership Intake class or Line and meets all required prerequisites for membership, full membership into the Brotherhood is conferred.

Kappa Psi Kappa has implemented a strict ban on hazing activities.

Chapters and Colonies 

Kappa Psi Kappa chapters are assigned a sequential Greek letter designation according to the order in which they were chartered. The oldest is the Alpha Chapter, located in Tallahassee, FL. Subsequent chapters were assigned successive letters of the Greek alphabet. After all single-letter designations were used, chapters were assigned double-letter combinations in the fashion "Alpha Alpha," "Alpha Beta," "Alpha Gamma," etc. The designation "Alpha Omega Kappa" is reserved as a symbolic "Chapter Eternal" for all Eternal Diamonds, members who have died.

Kappa Psi Kappa chapters and colonies are metropolitan based, serving the cities in which the Charter member lives and then extending for a two-hour radius.

Below is a list of current Active Chapters and Colonies:

 Alpha Chapter - Tallahassee, FL
 Delta Chapter - Chicago, IL
 Zeta Colony - Atlanta, GA
 Eta Chapter - Philadelphia, PA
 Lambda Chapter - Boston, MA
 Mu Chapter - Raleigh, NC
 Nu Chapter - New York City, NY
 Alpha Zeta Chapter - Detroit, MI

Symbols and traditions 

The heraldic crest of Kappa Psi Kappa contains ten symbolic elements, each of which carries a special meaning to the Fraternity.

The fraternity's mascot is the White Bengal Tiger, representing the rarity, beauty, and strength of a man of Kappa Psi Kappa.

The fraternity's colors are Baby Blue, Gold, New Black.

The formal motto of the fraternity is "One Brotherhood, One Bond."

The highest honor bestowed by Kappa Psi Kappa Fraternity is the status of Constellation member.  A Constellation is a member who is recognized by the Fraternity as being a leading figure, mentor, who has demonstrated exemplary service to both Brotherhood and Community.

Structure and Policies

Governing Structure 

Kappa Psi Kappa Fraternity, Inc is governed by its  National Executive Board  which is made up of seven voting positions known as the  Executive Board  and four non-voting positions known as the  Administrative Staff 

 Executive Board 

Supreme President- Elected leader of the Fraternity.  Responsible for national plan of actions, and vision for his term.
First Supreme Anti-President- Responsible for membership intake, international membership, and honorary membership.
Second Supreme Anti-President- Responsible for membership expansion, colonization, and reactivation.
Third Supreme Anti-President- Responsible for community service, fraternal philanthropy, and scholarship.
Supreme Keeper of Record- Responsible for fraternal meetings, minutes, and agendas.
Supreme Keeper of Exchequer- Responsible for fraternal finances.
National Executive Director- Responsible for day-to-day business, national committees, and administrative positions.

 Administrative Staff 

Supreme Epistoleus- Fraternal historian
Supreme Editor-In-Chief- Responsible for Apollo's Dream
Supreme Guard- Responsible for ensuring that all fraternal policies adhere to the national constitution
Supreme Chaplain- 
Webmaster-

Convention 
Kappa Psi Kappa is governed by its Convention called Conclave, which is officially the highest authority in the fraternity. Conclave is held biannually in conjunction with the other organizations of Tau Kappa Phi.  As a body, comprises delegates from every active chapter, as well as member-at-large representatives and the fraternity's National Executive Board. The first Conclave was held in 2006 in Orlando, Florida. Previously the location of Conclave changed with every convening, but in 2014 it was decided that Conclave would be permanently hosted in Atlanta, Georgia.

Service 
Though chapters organize their own community events throughout the year, there are three fraternity-sponsored service initiatives that Kappa Psi Kappa chapters participate in alongside other chapters across the nation: Project B.O.O.K. (Bank of Opportunistic Knowledge), Project 2001 Hours Served, and Midas Touch.

Tau Kappa Phi

The history of the Kappa Family is unique because the family was not formed all at one time. Kappa Psi Kappa's founding on August 17, 2001, in Tallahassee, FL marked the beginning of it. On February 20, 2002, the sorority and fraternity pair of Phi Nu Kappa and Alpha Psi Kappa were formed on the Florida State University campus. They joined the Kappa Family on March 28, 2002. The last organization to join was the Kappa Sapphires founded on April 8, 2002. The Kappa Family gave itself Greek letters on August 13, 2002. Tau Kappa Phi (The Kappa Family) became the Grand Chapter for all members.

See also
 List of LGBT fraternities and sororities

References

Fraternities and sororities in the United States
Student organizations established in 2001
LGBT fraternities and sororities
2001 establishments in Florida
LGBT in Florida